Breakout is a British television drama film written by Michael Stewart, first broadcast on BBC1 on 22 April 1997. Directed by Moira Armstrong, the film starred Neil Dudgeon and Samantha Bond as scientists Neil McFarlane and Lisa Temple, who join to investigate a mysterious death. The film was writer Michael Stewart's second science-based TV project, following ITV's Bliss, which premiered in 1995. According to BFI records, the original working title for the film was "The Lab".

The film co-starred Dermot Crowley, Jasper Britton and Janet Dale; with Carolyn Pickles, Hugh Bonneville, Joe Swash and Benedict Wong also amongst the additional cast members. BBC Genome Project records list the original description for the film as; "When a rare illness strikes down three people near a scientific research site, doctors battle against time to discover if a genetically-engineered pesticide, designed only to affect insects, has jumped the species gap during field tests." Notably, the film has never been released on VHS or DVD.

Cast
 Neil Dudgeon as Dr. Neil McFarlane
 Samantha Bond as Dr. Lisa Temple
 Dermot Crowley as Dr. Bill Galton
 Jasper Britton as Lenny Johnson
 Janet Dale as Gwenda Irwing
 Nigel Clauzel	as Alex James
 Marius Stanescu as Stefan Popescu
 Peter Jeffrey as Professor Bannerman
 William Chubb as Det. Insp. Matthews
 Toby Salaman as Dr. John Underwood
 Carolyn Pickles as Diane Cresswell
 Garry Cooper as Andy Cresswell
 Joe Swash as Jason Cresswell 
 Lisa Kelly as Heather Collins
 Hilary Lyon as Phillippa McFarlane
 Hugh Bonneville as Peter Schneider
 Benedict Wong as Jerry Kane
 Vanessa Earl as Suzanne Drake
 Kathleen Bidmead as Olga Livingstone

References

External links

1997 films
1997 television films
1997 drama films
BBC Film films
British television films